Owego Apalachin Central School District is a school district in Owego, New York.

List of schools
High School (Grades 9–12):
Owego Free Academy
Middle School (Grades 6–8):
Owego Apalachin Middle School
Elementary Schools (Grades K-5):
Apalachin Elementary School
Owego Elementary School

See also
 List of school districts in New York

References

External links
 

School districts in New York (state)
Education in Tioga County, New York